San Mauro Pascoli is a comune (municipality) in the Province of Forlì-Cesena in the Italian region Emilia-Romagna, located about  southeast of Bologna and about  southeast of Forlì.

The comune was called San Mauro di Romagna until 1932, when its name was changed in honor of the poet Giovanni Pascoli and his beloved sister Maria, who were born here. Famous Italian shoe designers Giuseppe Zanotti and Sergio Rossi were also born there.

Main sights
Torlonia tower
Roman furnaces
Giovanni Pascoli House

Twin towns
 Moena, Italy
 Teggiano, Italy, since 1971 
  Cluj-Napoca, Romania, since 1996 
  Naumburg, Germany, since 2001 
  Pinsk, Belarus, since 2002

References

External links
 Official website

Cities and towns in Emilia-Romagna